Spirit Halloween, LLC is an American seasonal retailer that supplies Halloween decorations, costumes, props and accessories. It is the USA's largest Halloween retailer. It is currently owned by Spencer Gifts. It was founded in 1983 and began in the Castro Valley Mall in San Francisco, California, and has headquarters in Egg Harbor Township, New Jersey. In 1999, the store had 60 seasonal locations. Today, the pop-up retailer opens over a thousand locations across the United States and Canada each October.

Business operations 
During the Halloween season, Spirit operates over 1,400 store locations in North America. The Spirit Halloween website is open year-round, offering its in-store products online. The store carries decor manufactured by Tekky Design, Gemmy, Yu Jun, Seasonal Visions International, Crazy Create, NewRaySun, PartyTime Costume, Seasons USA, Morbid Enterprises, Pan Asian Creations and more. Many decorations are exclusive to Spirit.

In early summer Spirit Halloween typically puts out teaser videos on social media and YouTube to create excitement for new items. A few days later the videos are followed by another one officially revealing and announcing the item.

The retailer makes use of vacant retail space. The stores typically operate for 60 to 90 days, opening sometime in early to mid-August and usually closing two or three days after Halloween.

Spirit Halloween's start 
Joe Marver created the Spirit Halloween business model, a pop-up store catering to Halloween revelers. Starting with his first pop-up location in the Castro Valley Mall in 1984, he grew Spirit Halloween to 60 seasonal stores nationwide before it was acquired in 1999. His approach to short-term leases, locations, and the stocking of widely varied merchandise was novel in the Halloween retail sector.

Today, the Spirit Halloween network of pop-up stores is bigger than any other specialty retailer in the category, with new ownership expanding Marver’s original concept to more than 1,100 locations across North America. Spirit Halloween serves a Halloween consumer market estimated at $8.4 billion yearly, according to the National Retail Federation. Despite online shopping creating challenges for brick and mortar stores, Spirit thrives with in person purchases-possibly due to its relatively lower overhead with seasonal rentals of the physical spaces.

Spirit of Children 
In 2006, Spirit launched a program called Spirit of Children to raise money in-store for children's hospitals. The program annually celebrates Halloween at hospital locations, supplying costumes and decorations for the events. Since 2007, Spirit of Children has raised over $29 million in donations.

Health Canada Recall 
On October 21, 2016, Health Canada recalled eight products from Spirit Halloween, for fire hazards and choking hazards. Despite promising to cease sales, Health Canada visited 45 stores across Canada and found that 23 stores continued to sell products that had been recalled.

Film

On April 11, 2022, it was announced that a film adaptation starring Christopher Lloyd and Rachael Leigh Cook was in development, with Strike Back Studios, Hideout Pictures, and Particular Crowd as co-producers, David Boag directing in his feature directorial debut, and Billie Bates writing. On July 31, 2022, the first teaser was released. The film was shot in Rome, Georgia and Nashville, Tennessee.

Pop culture
The “Halloween of Horror” episode of The Simpsons featured a parody of Spirit Halloween.
Two popular memes have spawned, one of them involving the superimposing of the Spirit Halloween logo over a closed/failing place or business sign and another involving the superimposing of a pop culture object, place, or character onto a costume bag from Spirit Halloween.

See also 
 Spencer Gifts

References

External links 
 

Halloween
Retail companies established in 1983
Party stores of the United States
Retail companies of Canada
Companies based in Atlantic County, New Jersey
Egg Harbor Township, New Jersey
1999 mergers and acquisitions
1983 establishments in New Jersey
American companies established in 1983
Halloween in the United States